Michael Gill (1923–2005) was an English television producer and director.

Michael Gill may also refer to:

 Michael Gates Gill, American author of How Starbucks Saved My Life
Michel Gill (born 1960), also known as Michael Gill, American actor
Michael Gill (cricketer) (born 1957), New Zealand cricketer
Michael Gill (cyclist) (born 1998), British road cyclist
Michael J. Gill (horseman), American Thoroughbred racehorse owner
Michael Joseph Gill (1864–1918), American politician from Missouri
Michael Henry Gill, co-founder of the Irish publisher Gill

See also
Mick Gill (1899–1980), Irish sportsperson